A xebec ( or ), also spelled zebec, was a Mediterranean sailing ship that was used mostly for trading.  Xebecs had a long overhanging bowsprit and aft-set mizzen mast. The term can also refer to a small, fast vessel of the sixteenth to nineteenth centuries, used almost exclusively in the Mediterranean Sea.

Description

Xebecs were ships similar to galleys primarily used by Barbary pirates, which have both lateen sails and oars for propulsion.  Early xebecs had two masts while later ships had three. Xebecs featured a distinctive hull with pronounced overhanging bow and stern,  and rarely displaced more than 200 tons, making them slightly smaller and with slightly fewer guns than frigates of the period.

Use by Barbary corsairs 
These ships were easy to produce and were cheap, and thus nearly every corsair captain (Raïs) had at least one xebec in his fleet. They could be of varying sizes. Some ships had only three guns while others had up to forty. Most xebecs had around 20-30 cannons,  and the overwhelming majority had swivel guns equipped.

After the 18th century, galleys became increasingly outdated and xebecs became the preferred ships of Barbary pirates thanks to their heavy and effective use of wind power, reduced need for slaves to row, ability to carry more cannons than a galley, and overall cheapness, speed, and maneuverability.

Xebecs were generally faster than contemporary ship types until the introduction of steamships.

Corsairs built their xebecs with a narrow floor to achieve a higher speed than their victims, but with a considerable beam in order to enable them to carry an extensive sail-plan. The lateen rig of the xebec allowed the ship to sail close hauled to the wind, often giving it an advantage in pursuit or escape.  The use of oars or sweeps allowed the xebec to approach vessels who were becalmed. When used as corsairs, the xebecs carried a crew of between 90 to 400 men.

The use of square rig among pirates was initially rare, although after the 1750s a mix between lateen and square rigs became much more widespread.

Use by European powers 
Some victorious xebecs of the Spanish Navy, about 1770 (see Antonio Barceló campaigns... in the Spanish version of the page of Wikipedia):
 Andaluz, 30 guns (4 × 8-pounders)
 Africa, 18 guns (4-pounders)
 Atrevido, 20 guns 
 Aventurero, 30 guns (3 × 8-pounders)
 Murciano, 16 guns, 4 pedreros (light swivel guns)
 San Antonio

Notable xebecs of the French Navy include four launched in 1750:
 Ruse, 160 tons, 18 guns
 Serpent, 160 tons burthen, 18 guns
 Requin, 260 tons burthen, 24 guns
 Indiscret, 260 tons burthen, 24 guns

In the eighteenth and early nineteenth centuries, a large polacre-xebec carried a square rig on the foremast, lateen sails on the other masts, a bowsprit, and two headsails. The square sail distinguished this form of a xebec from that of a felucca which is equipped solely with lateen sails.  The last of the xebecs in use by European navies were fully square-rigged and were termed xebec-frigates.

The British brig-sloop Speedy's (14 guns, 54 men) defeat of the Spanish xebec-frigate El Gamo (32 guns, 319 men) on 6 May 1801 is generally regarded as one of the most remarkable single-ship actions in naval history. It was the foundation of the legendary reputation of the Speedys commander, Lord Cochrane, which has in turn provided the inspiration for sea fiction such as Patrick O'Brian's Master and Commander.

Etymology 
Xebec is also written as xebeck, xebe(c)que, zebec(k), zebecque, chebec, shebeck; from (Catalan: xebec, now chebec, now jabeque, now xabeco, zambecco, stambecco,  and ). 
Words similar in form and meaning to xebec occur in Catalan, French, Spanish, Portuguese, Italian, Arabic and Turkish. The Online Etymology Dictionary regards the Arabic shabbak (meaning "a small warship") as the source form; however, the Arabic root means 'a net', implying the word originally referred to a fishing boat.

See also
 Polacca
 USS Champion
 Dhow

References

External links

Arabian chebec High-resolution photos of a model of an eighteenth-century xebec
book "Chebec Le Requin 1750" with English Translation, by Jean Boudroit, 1991
 Definition of xebec source

Age of Sail ships
Sailboat types
 
Tall ships
Pirate ships